Banxin station is a station on the Taipei Metro's Circular line. The station was opened on 31 January 2020. It is located in Banqiao District, New Taipei, Taiwan.

Station layout

Around the station
 Banqiao First Stadium (850m southwest of the station)
 Minsheng Park (500m southeast of the station)
 Bu Qian Market (650m east of the station)

References

Circular line stations (Taipei Metro)
Railway stations opened in 2020
2020 establishments in Taiwan